Keith Pickett Holmes (born March 30, 1969) is an American former boxer.

Professional career

Holmes began his pro career in 1989 and captured the WBC Middleweight Title by scoring a TKO over Quincy Taylor in 1996. He defended the title twice before losing the belt to Hassine Cherifi in 1998, a decision loss in which he dropped Cherifi once. In 1999, Holmes landed a rematch with Cherifi and regained the belt via a 7th-round TKO. Holmes again defended the title twice before losing the belt to middleweight legend Bernard Hopkins in a clear-cut decision loss as part of the Middleweight World Championship Series unification tournament.  He continued to fight sparingly after the loss to Hopkins, and in 2005 lost an IBF Light Middleweight Title Eliminator bout against Roman Karmazin in a close majority decision.

Holmes is a vegan.

Professional boxing record

See also
List of world middleweight boxing champions

References

External links

 

|-

1969 births
Living people
American male boxers
Boxers from Washington, D.C.
African-American boxers
World middleweight boxing champions
World Boxing Council champions